Nippononebria campbelli is a species of ground beetle from Nebriinae family that is endemic to the US state of Washington.

References

Beetles described in 1984
Beetles of North America
Endemic fauna of Washington (state)